Flannels is a British multi-brand retailer. The company currently has 45 locations open in the United Kingdom.

In 1976, Neil Prosser founded Flannels. He remained the managing director until the brand was acquired by Frasers Group (formerly Sports Direct International) in 2017.

History 
Neil Prosser founded Flannels in 1976 with a menswear store in Knutsford, Cheshire.

Neil Prosser’s friendship with retailer Jim Gibson led to a joint venture in 1995 with womenswear and menswear stores under the name, Cruise Flannels, being opened in Nottingham and subsequently in Birmingham and Newcastle in 1996.

In February 2000 Prosser and Gibson went their separate ways after their venture grew to 17 stores nationwide, and the Cruise Flannels shops in Birmingham and Nottingham were rebranded as Flannels sites.

In 2012, Frasers Group bought a majority 51% stake in Flannels and in 2017 they acquired the brand in full.

References

External links
 

Retail companies of the United Kingdom
Retail companies established in 1976
1976 establishments in England
English brands
Sports Direct